Hamish Gard (born 21 June 1985) is a New Zealand rugby union player. He played as a centre.

Career
Gard attended Palmerston North Boys' High School. In 2003 Gard made the Hurricanes Secondary Schools Team. He played for the Crusaders in the Super Rugby competition between 2008-09, after 3 years for the Canterbury provincial team.

He played for Montpellier in the French league Top 14 from February 2013 to December 2013; and returned for the 2014 season. Before and after he played for La Rochelle in December 2013,then La Rochelle for 2014, before finally returning a third time in 2014-2015; and played until 2015 when he signed for the Mitsubishi Sagamihara DynaBoars (Japan) until 2017.

Following his professional rugby career, Hamish accepted an offer to join Xigo as both a Project Manager in the construction industry and also a midfielder in the Div 3, 7 aside football team, The Xigoals. Hamish rewarded the investment early in his stint at Xigo netting 10 goals on the way to securing the Div 3 Championship and also the Golden Boot.

References

External links

1985 births
Living people
Rugby union centres
Crusaders (rugby union) players
Canterbury rugby union players
NTT DoCoMo Red Hurricanes Osaka players
Mitsubishi Sagamihara DynaBoars players
Montpellier Hérault Rugby players
Stade Rochelais players
People educated at Palmerston North Boys' High School
New Zealand rugby union players
New Zealand expatriate rugby union players
Expatriate rugby union players in Japan
Expatriate rugby union players in France
New Zealand expatriate sportspeople in Japan
New Zealand expatriate sportspeople in France
Rugby union fly-halves